Juan Crisóstomo Bonilla Pérez (27 January 1835 – 30 January 1884) was a Mexican general. He was born in Tetela de Ocampo, Puebla, and died in Veracruz.

References

1835 births
1884 deaths
Presidents of the Chamber of Deputies (Mexico)
Mexican military officers